West Isles is a civil parish in Charlotte County, New Brunswick, Canada, comprising a single local service district (LSD), which is a member of the Southwest New Brunswick Service Commission (SNBSC).

The parish contains dozens of offshore islands but only the largest, Deer Island, is inhabited. There are no bridges and only Deer Island has ferry service.

Origin of name
Historian William Francis Ganong considered the name to come from the islands' position.

History
West Isles was erected in 1786 as one of the original parishes of the county, including Deer Island, Campobello, and Grand Manan, and islands in Cobscook Bay claimed by Britain.

Boundaries
West Isles Parish is bounded:

 on the northeast by the Letete Passage and the Bay of Fundy;
 on the east by the Bay of Fundy;
 on the southeast by Head Harbour Passage;
 on the southwest and west by the  international border, running through the Western Passage and Passamaquoddy Bay.

Evolution of boundaries

In 1803 Campobello was erected as its own parish, including nearby minor islands; Campobello inherited West Isles' claims to Cobscook Bay.

In 1816 Grand Manan and was erected as its own parish, including nearby minor islands.

In 1877 the parish's boundary were clarified: Campobello Parish's boundary running through Head Harbour Passage, Saint George Parish's through Letete Passage rather than two miles from the mainland, transferring several islands from Saint George to West Isles.

Local service district
The local service district of the parish of West Isles comprises the entire parish.

The LSD was established in 1970 to assess for fire protection. First aid and ambulance services were added in 1982, recreational facilities in 1987.

Today the LSD assesses community & recreation services as well as the basic LSD services of fire protection, police services, land use planning, emergency measures, and dog control. The taxing authority is 517.00 West Isles.

Communities
Communities at least partly within the parish. italics indicate a name no longer in official use

 Chocolate Cove
 Cummings Cove
 Fairhaven
 Hersonville
 Lamberts Cove
 Lambertville
 Leonardville
 Lords Cove
 Northern Harbour (North Harbour)
 Richardson
 Stuart Town

Bodies of water
Bodies of water at least partly within the parish. italics indicate a name no longer in official use

 Deans Creek
 Mill Creek
 Welch Creek
 Bay of Fundy
 Passamaquoddy Bay
 Fish Harbour
 Leonardville Harbour
 Northern Harbour (North Harbour)
 Northwest Harbour
 Ship Harbour
 Leonards Lake
 Doyles Passage (False Passage, Pendleton Passage)
 Faux Passage
 Head Harbour Passage
 Indian River
 Irish Channel
 Letete Passage
 Little Letete Passage
 Quoddy River
 The Notch
 Western Passage

Islands
Islands at least partly within the parish. italics indicate a name no longer in official use

 Adam Island
  Bar Island
 Barnes Island
 Beans Island (Bains Island)
 Casco Bay Island (Casco Island)
 Cherry Island
 Crow Island
  Deer Island
 Dinner Island
 English Island
 Fish Island
 Green Island
 Hardwood Island
 Hospital Islands
 Indian Island
 Jameson Island
 Little Island
 Macs Island (McMaster Island)
 Marble Island (Rouen Islet)
 Mink Island
 Mohawk Island
 Mowat Island
 New Ireland
 Nub Island
 Nubble Island
 Parker Island
 Partridge Island
 Pendleton Island
 Popes Island
 St. Helena Island
 Sandy Island
 Simpsons Island
 Spectacle Islands (Spectacle Island, The Specs)
 Spruce Island
 The Pup
 Thumb Cap (Thrumcap Island)
 Tinkers Island
 White Horse Island
 White Island

Other notable places
Parks, historic sites, and other noteworthy places at least partly within the parish.
 The Old Sow
 Whitehorse Island Protected Natural Area

Demographics

Population

Language

Access Routes
Highways and numbered routes that run through the parish, including external routes that start or finish at the parish limits:

Highways
None

Principal Routes
None

Secondary Routes:

External Routes:
 Letete to Deer Island Ferry
Cummings Cove to Eastport Ferry
Cummings Cove to Welshpool Ferry

See also
List of parishes in New Brunswick

Notes

References

Local service districts of Charlotte County, New Brunswick
Parishes of Charlotte County, New Brunswick